General Adam may refer to:

Abdikarim Yusuf Adam (died 2015), Somali National Army general
Frederick Adam (1781–1853), British Army general
Ronald Forbes Adam (1885–1982), British Army general
Udi Adam (born 1958), Israel Defense Forces general
Wilhelm Adam (general) (1877–1949), German Wehrmacht colonel general
Wilhelm Adam (1893–1978), German Wehrmacht major general
Yekutiel Adam (1927–1982), Israel Defense Forces major general

See also
General Adams (disambiguation)